This is list of Acts of the Northern Ireland Assembly from its establishment in 1999 up until the present.

 No Acts of the Northern Ireland Assembly were passed in 1999.
 List of Acts of the Northern Ireland Assembly from 2000
 List of Acts of the Northern Ireland Assembly from 2001
 List of Acts of the Northern Ireland Assembly from 2002
 No Acts of the Northern Ireland Assembly were passed from 2003 to 2006.
 List of Acts of the Northern Ireland Assembly from 2007
 List of Acts of the Northern Ireland Assembly from 2008
 List of Acts of the Northern Ireland Assembly from 2009
 List of Acts of the Northern Ireland Assembly from 2010
 List of Acts of the Northern Ireland Assembly from 2011
 List of Acts of the Northern Ireland Assembly from 2012
 List of Acts of the Northern Ireland Assembly from 2013
 List of Acts of the Northern Ireland Assembly from 2014
 List of Acts of the Northern Ireland Assembly from 2015
 List of Acts of the Northern Ireland Assembly from 2016
 No Acts of the Northern Ireland Assembly were passed from 2017 to 2019.
 List of Acts of the Northern Ireland Assembly from 2020
 List of Acts of the Northern Ireland Assembly from 2021
 List of Acts of the Northern Ireland Assembly from 2022
 List of Acts of the Northern Ireland Assembly from 2023

Northern Ireland
 
Acts of the Northern Ireland Assembly